Joseph Whipp (born July 12, 1941) is an American actor who has starred in many films and starred on television. He is known for playing police officers in films and on television.

Career 
Whipp taught drama Carlmont High School in the 1970s. His first role was as Nicky in the 1973 film The Enforcer. His first credited role was in the 1979 movie Escape from Alcatraz as a prison guard. He later on appeared in the 1984 horror movie A Nightmare on Elm Street as a cop and the 1987 science fiction movie The Hidden. He also starred in the 1996 hit horror movie Scream as a sheriff as well as the 1989 horror video classic Death Spa as the ill-fated paranormal investigator Dr. Lido Moray. His most recent film is in the 2010 movie Downstream.

Whipp has starred in the soap operas Generations as Charles Mullen from 1989–1990, and on General Hospital as Marty in 1991. He has made many guest appearances on television series, including Lou Grant, The Dukes of Hazzard, Golden Girls, Night Court, Cheers, ER, Monk and The Middle.

Filmography

Film

Television

External links

1941 births
American male film actors
American male soap opera actors
American male television actors
Living people
Male actors from San Francisco
20th-century American male actors
21st-century American male actors